Jokatte is a census town in Dakshina Kannada district in the Indian state of Karnataka.

Demographics
 India census, Thokur-62 had a population of 6166. Males constitute 51% of the population and females 49%. Thokur-62 has an average literacy rate of 77%, higher than the national average of 59.5%: male literacy is 82%, and female literacy is 71%. In Thokur-62, 13% of the population is under 6 years of age.

References

Cities and towns in Dakshina Kannada district